The 2003 AFF Futsal Championship was held in Kuantan, Malaysia from 1 July to 6 July 2003.  Cambodia were the original hosts for this edition of the tournament but were unable to get their venue ready in time.  Subsequently, the ASEAN Football Federation requested Malaysia to take over as hosts.

Defending champions Thailand, have sent a reserve team for this tournament as their main players were left behind to prepare for the AFC Futsal Championship which took place at the end of the month.

Tournament

Group stage

Third place play-off

Final

Winner

Goalscorers 
The following is the list of goalscorers and the amount each scored in the tournament.  It unknown in which games each player scored.  Only the given information above for each match is known.

14 goals
 Joe Nuengkord

12 goals
 Chan Veasna

9 goals
 Anucha Munjarern

8 goals
 Sermphan Khumthinkaew

7 goals
 Muhammad Hardyman Lamit
 Chan Arunreath
 Lertchai Issarasuwipakorn

6 goals
 Andri Irawan
 Felix Arifin
 Vennard Vonarza Victor
 Jimmy Doña
 Prasert Innui

4 goals
 Sabtu Lupat
 Koa Kiri
 Andrian Asuri
 Jadet Punpoem

3 goals
 Ek Sovanara
 Akbar Mallarangan
 Mohamad Feroz Abdul Karnim
 Mohd Saiful Mohd Noor
 Pongpipat Kamnuan

2 goals
 Khairol Anwar Yaakub
 Tun Dimong
 Edward Amaludin
 Jamhuri Zainuddin
 Mohamed Faizul Abdul Ghaffar
 Kittisak Tanasuwan

1 goal
 Norazmiezul Maipaizan Amidon
 Sumardi Taib
 Mohammad Shahril Ismail
 Kim Chanbunrith
 Achmad Ramdani
 Tommy Yulian Sabruni
 J.Arasan
 Zainodin Kasmidim
 Morgan Veloo
 Roger Lastimado
 Goni Tongson

References 
General
"AFF Futsal Championship 2003" ASEAN Football Federation.

Specific

External links
 Old website (Archived)
 Official website

AFF Futsal Championship
2003
Fut
2003 in Asian futsal